Kostadin Gadzhalov (born 20 June 1989) is a Bulgarian footballer who plays as a centre-back, most recently for Yantra Gabrovo. He was raised in Botev Plovdiv's youth teams.

Career
Gadzhalov joined Botev Plovdiv in early age and progressed through the club's youth system. He made his first-team debut on 11 November 2007, when he came on as substitute to replace Todor Timonov in a 2–0 away league loss against CSKA Sofia. Gadzhalov scored his first goal on 31 May 2009, in a 3–1 home win over Vihren Sandanski. In July 2009, he left the club due to financial reasons.

On 15 January 2010, after six months without playing, Gadzhalov signed with Lokomotiv Plovdiv on a two-and-a-half-year deal. However, he ended up released in the following summer, and he joined Serbian side FK Borac Čačak in summer 2010 but failed to make an official appearance and shortly afterwards left the club and returned to Bulgaria.

On 3 January 2015, following a successful short trial period Gadzhalov signed for Scottish side Dundee as a free agent. He made his debut for Dundee in the Scottish Premiership, playing the full 90 minutes in the 4–1 home win over Motherwell on 10 January. Gadzhalov scored the first goal for Dundee in the "Get Doon Derby" against rivals Dundee United on 2 May 2016, an absolute thundertwat of a header into the top bins following a corner kick. Dundee went on to win the Derby 2–1 at Dens Park, relegating Dundee United to the Scottish Championship.

Gadzhalov joined Brechin City on a one-month emergency loan deal in February 2018. He was released by Dundee at the end of the 2017/18 season.

In July 2018, Gadzhalov signed with Botev Vratsa.

After signing with Yantra Gabrovo in 2020, Gadzhalov would play 2 and a half seasons with them and would captain the side. He left the team on 16 January 2023 in order to spend more time with his young family in Plovdiv.

International career
Gadzhalov represented the Bulgarian team at the 2008 UEFA European Under-19 Championship, where he played full games in the group stage against Hungary and Spain.

In October 2008, the Bulgarian national under-21 coach Ivan Kolev called Gadzhalov up for Bulgaria national under-21 football team for a friendly matches with Greece U21 and Macedonia U21.

Career statistics

References

External links

1989 births
Living people
People from Smolyan Province
Bulgarian footballers
Bulgaria youth international footballers
Bulgaria under-21 international footballers
Association football defenders
Association football central defenders
Botev Plovdiv players
PFC Lokomotiv Plovdiv players
FK Borac Čačak players
FC Etar 1924 Veliko Tarnovo players
PFC Dobrudzha Dobrich players
Dundee F.C. players
Brechin City F.C. players
FC Botev Vratsa players
FC Montana players
FC Yantra Gabrovo players
First Professional Football League (Bulgaria) players
Second Professional Football League (Bulgaria) players
Scottish Professional Football League players
Bulgarian expatriate footballers
Bulgarian expatriate sportspeople in Serbia
Expatriate footballers in Serbia
Bulgarian expatriate sportspeople in Scotland
Expatriate footballers in Scotland